The 2015 Villanova Wildcats football team represented Villanova University in the 2015 NCAA Division I FCS football season. They were led by 31st-year head coach Andy Talley and played their home games at Villanova Stadium. They were a member of the Colonial Athletic Association. They finished the season 6–5, 5–3 in CAA play to finish in a three-way tie for fourth place.

Schedule

Game summaries

at UConn

at Fordham

Delaware

Penn

William & Mary

at Albany

at Towson

Maine

at Rhode Island

Richmond

at James Madison

Ranking movements

References

Villanova
Villanova Wildcats football seasons
Villanova Wildcats football